Ford Park is a popular facility operated by the City of Shreveport, the seat of Caddo Parish in northwestern Louisiana. The  park is located in north Shreveport at 5784 South Lakeshore Drive near the municipal pier and boat launch. 

The park is named for John McWilliams Ford, mayor of Shreveport from 1918 to 1922 and its finance commissioner from 1930 until his death in 1965.

Lo Walker, the mayor of Bossier City, married his wife, Adele, at Ford Park in 1962.

References

Parks in Louisiana
Protected areas of Caddo Parish, Louisiana
Geography of Shreveport, Louisiana
Tourist attractions in Shreveport, Louisiana